Halldóra Vanda Sigurgeirsdóttir (born 28 June 1965) is an Icelandic former multi-sport athlete who played both for the Icelandic national football team and the Icelandic national basketball team. In 2001 she became the first woman in Iceland to coach a men's football team when she was hired as the manager of Neisti Hofsósi. In 2020, she was awarded the Order of the Falcon for her work towards women's football. In 2021, she became the first female chairman of the Football Association of Iceland.

Early life
Vanda started playing football at an early age with the boys team of Ungmennafélag Tindastóll. When she moved to Akureyri to study at the Menntaskólinn á Akureyri, she played with a women's team for the first time.

Football

Club career
Vanda started her senior team career with Knattspyrnufélag Akureyrar in 1982 in the second-tier league. She went on to play several seasons in the Icelandic top-tier Úrvalsdeild kvenna with ÍA and Breiðablik. Her last game was on 21 June 2008 when she was called into Tindastóll's squad an hour before its game against Höttur due to an injury to Tindastóll's goalkeeper. It was the first time in her career that she had played the goalkeeper position.

National team career
From 1985 to 1996, Vanda played 37 matches for the Icelandic national football team, scoring one goal. She was the captain of the team for 28 matches.

Executive career
On 2 October 2021, Vanda became the first female chairman of the Football Association of Iceland.

Titles
Icelandic championships: 1984, 1985, 1987, 1990, 1991, 1992, 1994, 1995, 1996
Icelandic Women's Football Cup: 1989, 1994, 1996

Awards
Úrvalsdeild kvenna Player of the Year: 1990

Basketball

Club career
Vanda played basketball for several seasons with Íþróttafélag Stúdenta. She was a key player in the ÍS team that won the national championship and the Icelandic Cup in 1991.

National team career
She played 9 games for the Icelandic national basketball team from 1989 to 1991. She helped the team to Bronze at the 1991 Games of the Small States of Europe.

References

External links

Vanda hættir mjög sátt hjá Breiðabliki
Profile at Íþróttabandalag Akraness
Profile at Breiðablik

1965 births
Living people
Vanda Sigurgeirsdottir
Vanda Sigurgeirsdottir
Vanda Sigurgeirsdottir
Vanda Sigurgeirsdottir
Vanda Sigurgeirsdottir
Female association football managers
Vanda Sigurgeirsdottir
Vanda Sigurgeirsdottir
Vanda Sigurgeirsdottir
Women's association footballers not categorized by position